Prosperidad Ciudadana is a political party in Guatemala.

History
Citizen Prosperity is a political party in formation, on June 26, 2016 the political party was registered by the Supreme Electoral Tribunal, and its registration process ended on June 25, 2019. It currently has 20,000 members, its general secretary is Dami Anita Elizabeth Kristenson Sales. The mayors of Moyuta and Villa Nueva seek to join the party and use it as a probable electoral platform in 2019. In November 12, 2018, the political organization concluded the requirements and was made official as a political party in the same month.

Presidential elections

Legislative elections

References

2018 establishments in Guatemala
Political parties established in 2018
Political parties in Guatemala